Zveno, Politicheski krŭg "Zveno", officially Political Circle "Zveno" was a Bulgarian political organization, founded in 1930 by Bulgarian politicians, intellectuals and Bulgarian Army officers. It was associated with a newspaper of that name.

As a palingenetic nationalist movement, Zveno advocated for rationalization of Bulgaria's economic and political institutions under a dictatorship that would be independent from both the Soviet Union and the Axis powers. They strongly opposed the Bulgarian party system, which they saw as dysfunctional, and the terror of the Internal Macedonian Revolutionary Organization (IMRO), the Bulgarian Macedonian liberation movement. Zveno was also closely linked to the so-called Military League, the organization behind a coup in 1923, responsible for killing Prime Minister Aleksandar Stamboliyski.

In 1934, pro-Zveno officers like Colonel Damyan Velchev and Colonel Kimon Georgiev seized power. Georgiev became Prime Minister. They dissolved all parties, political organizations and trade unions and openly attacked the IMRO. As a political organization itself, Zveno dissolved itself. The new government introduced a corporatist economy, similar to that of Benito Mussolini's Italy. As a nationalist organization, Zveno changed many of the Ottoman-era Turkish place names of villages and towns in Bulgaria to Bulgarian ones. King Boris III, an opponent of Zveno, orchestrated a coup through a monarchist Zveno member, General Pencho Zlatev, who became Prime Minister (January 1935). In April 1935, he was replaced by a civilian, Andrey Toshev, also a monarchist.  After participating in the Bulgarian coup d'état of 1934, Zveno supporters declared their intention to immediately form an alliance with France and to seek the unification of Bulgaria into an Integral Yugoslavia.  Zveno supported an Integral Yugoslavia that included Bulgaria as well as Albania within it.

In 1943, Zveno joined the anti-Axis resistance movement, the Fatherland Front. In September 1944, the Fatherland Front engineered a coup d'état. Georgiev became Prime Minister and Velchev Minister of Defense, and they managed to sign a ceasefire agreement with the Soviet Union.

In 1946, Velchev resigned in protest against communist actions, while Georgiev was succeeded by communist leader Georgi Dimitrov, after which Bulgaria became a People's Republic. Georgiev remained in government until 1962, but Zveno was disbanded as an autonomous organization in 1949. Zveno continued to exist within the Fatherland Front but was only a puppet organization by then.

References

External links
 Bulgarizaedno
 Liternet.

1927 establishments in Bulgaria
Nationalist parties in Bulgaria
Parties of one-party systems
Political parties established in 1927
Political parties disestablished in 1949
Defunct political parties in Bulgaria
Bulgaria–Yugoslavia relations
Pan-Slavism
Formerly banned far-right parties
1949 disestablishments in Bulgaria